Marcin Malek (born 24 February 1975, in Warsaw, Poland) is a Polish poet, writer, playwright, and publicist. Also writing under Martin Smallridge pen name  Studied International Affairs (diplomacy) and Custom Administration Services. Also literature translator - Russian and English (both ways), including press articles in the field of international affairs and cultural releases as well as Russian and English-language poetry along with the letters of Alexander Sergeyevich Pushkin. Published mainly in  quarterlies: „Fronda”, „Tygiel Kultury”, „Akcent” and monthlies: „Nowe Państwo”, „Stosunki Międzynarodowe”, „Opcja na prawo”, "Dziś", Winner of the annual award  of  "Poetry&Paratheatre" journal  (category: poem of the Year) for year 2012, (work: „Bieg – Czyli list do współczesnych”/"Run – a letter to the present"). Since 2006 lives in Ireland.

Creative activity

In recent years Malek devoted himself mainly to poetry. As he says: he "finally found a place where he belongs, and all that he owns, is the power of his words, and a momentous awareness of consequences". He is of the opinion, that "poetry is like a spurt; elusive, and not enough to say —  inexplicable". In his writing "poetry is the way into the unknown is still asks questions and never hears correct answers. And so – to be a poet is no more than wander around and ask every encountered soul for directions." In his opinion, poetry is "a storage of historical curiosities, in which we keep rarely used words, and poets are workers who use these words as the raw material. The snag is that they work blindly because with such material you can never be sure, and it is difficult to predict what falls out of the assembly line." In his opinions of other poets he expresses himself very carefully saying that they live "somewhere out there, where we mere mortals do not have access – on the other side, in the midst of spells, myths and legends." He explains that "poets have something in common with the unfortunate Icarus, whose flight and fall are widespread symbols of the human thoughtful pursuit of unattainable objectives against the natural order of the world. We want to see them as those who are in pursuit of reality, those fully aware of their tremendous responsibility, always faithful to a supreme idea, entering boldly where none seemingly normal would dare to enter – mainly because our "me" bothers us more than anything else. Poet (who lives inside us) has thousands of them – continues in perpetual flight to fall and to rise, and so it goes, he passes from one dimension to another becoming his own multiplication. Sometimes Malek calls himself an invented character, once he admitted that he associates with the ghosts, and that "under the pressure of certain words", he simply "does not know how to be himself."

Books

 Fabryka słów w stu jeden wierszach, Wyd. Wydawnictwo Miniatura, Kraków 2010. 
Words factory in a hundred and one poems, Publisher. Miniatura, Krakow 2010.

 My wszyscy z wierszy Wyd. Wydawnictwo Miniatura, Kraków 2011. 
We are all of the poems, Publisher. Miniatura, Krakow 2011.

 Z powiek opłatki krwi. Wyd. Wydawnictwo Miniatura, Kraków 2011. 
 Blood wafers of eyelids, Publisher. Miniatura, Krakow 2011.

 Spomiędzy rzeczy. Wyd. Wydawnictwo Miniatura, Kraków 2012. 
Among the things, Publisher. Miniatura, Krakow 2012. (Bilingual book Polish/English)

 Pamiętnik z niedokończonej wyprawy. Wyd. Miniatura, Kraków 2012. 
Diary of an unfinished journey, Publisher. Miniatura, Krakow 2012.(Bilingual book Polish/English)

 Nazwijcie mnie idiotą. Wyd. Wydawnictwo Miniatura, Kraków 2012. 
Call me an idiot, Publisher. Miniatura, Krakow 2012.

 Jedną nogą. Wyd. Wydawnictwo Miniatura, Kraków 2013. 
By one leg, Publisher. Miniatura, Krakow 2013. (Bilingual book Polish/English)

 For life and death of a poet. Publisher Lyrics, Lublin 2015.   
ASIN B014B7L66Y (English)

 Na życie i śmierć poety. Publisher Lyrics, Lublin 2015.  
"For life and death of a poet. Lyrics, 2015". ASIN B014CCFOCK

 Znaki żywego alfabetu. Publisher Lyrics, Lublin 2015.  " The characters of live alphabet. Lyrics, 2015". 
ASIN B014N3KQCG

 Facies Hippocratica. Publisher Lyrics, 2015. 
 "Najgorsze jest pierwsze sto lat". Publisher
Lyrics, 2015. 
"The worst part is a firs hundred years, Lyrics 2015"

 Ponad miarę ludzkiej materii. Publisher Lyrics, 2015.  "Beyond the measure of human matter, Lyrics 2015"

 Anthology of slavic poetry. by Piotr Kasjas Lulu.com, 16 Oct 2016. , poems on pages 161-165.

 We'll go asleep. Poems and ballads. Publisher Lyrics, 2020 Portlaoise. ,ASIN : B08NF32F8N Lyrics 2020"

 Breaking through the inky night: On trivial yet deadly serious matters. Publisher Lyrics Editorial House, May 13, 2021, Portlaoise. ,ASIN :  B094TG1P6W Lyrics 2021". Published under pen name Martin Smallridge

 The mills kept grinding. Publisher Lyrics Editorial House, August 25, 2021, Portlaoise. ,ASIN :  B09DMXTHMR Lyrics Editorial House 2021". Published under pen name Martin Smallridge

Journals

 "Fronda" nr 29, wiosna 2003
Chcemy znać ostatnią wersję prawdy

 "Fronda" nr 31, Boże Narodzenie 2003
Kto nie widział, ten nie zrozumie

 Kwartalnik "Akcent" nr 4 (94) 2003
Od Puszkina do Czuchraja. Literackie szkice o Rosji

 "Stosunki Międzynarodowe":

Terroryzm medialny – Nowa forma komunikacji międzyludzkiej, wrzesień 2004

Trzy maski na jedną twarz, październik 2004

Kłopotliwy Karzeł w Cieniu Giganta, październik 2004

Kto się boi Sharona?, listopad 2004

Zaolzie i Spisz, kwiecień 2005

Rosyjskie a priori, maj 2005

 "Tygiel Kultury" nr 10-12/2004
Apokalipsa po rosyjsku

 "Fronda" nr 35, wiosna 2005
Rosyjski übermensch

 "Opcja na prawo" nr 10/46, październik 2005
Rosja jak "dzika Bela"

 "Opcja na prawo" nr 11/47, listopad 2005
Gwiazdozbiór smoka

 "Tygiel Kultury" nr 10-12/2005
Gwiazdozbiór smoka

 "Nowe Państwo" nr 1 (361), zima 2006
Wiek Smoka

 "Opcja na prawo" nr 1/49, styczeń 2006
Brunatny wiatr odnowy

 "Tygiel Kultury" nr 1-3/2006
Rosja jak "dzika Bela"

 "Worldpress.org" August 3, 2016
The Jedwabne Massacre of 1941: An Interview with Marcin Malek "
by Teri Schure

 "Worldpress.org" March 12, 2018
"Polish Death Camps" Controversy

 "Leinster Express" May 17, 2020
"Portlaoise story in a time of Covid lockdown

References
 „Poetry&Paratheatre” Awards 2012

External links
 National Library of Poland
 National Library of Ireland
 Google Books
 Goodreads (Martin Smallridge)
Tygiel Kultury10_12_2004
Tygiel Kultury 10_12_2005
Tygiel Kultury 1_3_2006
Fronda 29
Fronda 31
Fronda 35
Kultura i Historia nr 8

1975 births
Living people
Polish poets
Polish male writers
Writers from Warsaw